The New Danger is the second studio album by American rapper Mos Def, released on October 12, 2004, by Rawkus and Geffen Records. It is the follow-up to his breakthrough solo effort Black on Both Sides (1999), after which he devoted more time into his film and stage career.

Production
Production for the album was handled by Mos Def, Kanye West, 88 Keys, Minnesota, Warryn Campbell, and Psycho Les. It also features contributions from Mos Def's rock musical project Black Jack Johnson, which was named after boxing champion Jack Johnson and consists of guitarist Dr. Know, keyboardist Bernie Worrell, bassist Doug Wimbish, and drummer Will Calhoun.

Critical reception 

The New Danger received generally mixed reviews from critics; it holds an aggregate score of 59 out of 100 at Metacritic. Blender called it "mushily sentimental, self-righteously indignant and constantly in your face", while AllMusic's Andy Kellman said it was "a sprawling, overambitious mess". New York magazine panned the album as "an unsatisfying muddle of protest music, black rock, and rap". In The New York Times, Kelefa Sanneh wrote that the record suffered from extended soul songs that meandered, dull rock songs, and some raps such as "The Rape Over" that were devoid of Mos Def's usual "warmth and wit". NME deemed some of the songs failed experiments but also highlighted "Boogie Man Song", "Modern Marvel", and "Champion Requiem" as more timeless material. Rolling Stone critic Tom Moon was more enthusiastic, hailing the album as an "earthy, impressively diverse" work that showcased Mos Def's abilities to "create deeply nuanced characterizations" and "broaden the hip-hop palette without sacrificing, or selling out, its core ideals". Writing for The Village Voice, Robert Christgau said while Mos Def's previous records were driven by his "verbal flow", The New Danger was more interesting musically and defined by its sonic flow, which the critic described as "a shadowy, guitar-drenched tone poem of the streets". In his ballot for the annual Pazz & Jop critics poll, he named it the 19th best album of 2004. LA Weekly included the track "Zimzallabim" in their list of "Ten Rap-Rock Songs That Are Actually Awesome".

Commercial performance
The New Danger was released by Geffen Records on October 12, 2004, in the United States and October 18 in the United Kingdom. It debuted at number five on the Billboard 200 in its first week, and by March 2014, it had sold 513,000 copies in the US. In August 2017, the album was certified gold by the RIAA, indicating sales and their equivalents—streams and track downloads—of 500,000 units in the U.S.

Track listing

Notes:	The UK Edition bonus track is also featured on his 2007 compilation album, Mos Definite.

Charts 

Singles

Certifications

Personnel 
 Mos Def - vocals, piano (track 1), drums (tracks 1 and 16), guitar, bass and percussion (track 16)
 Black Jack Johnson - House Band (feat. Will Calhoun - drums, Doug Wimbish - bass, Dr. Know - guitar and Bernie Worrell - keyboard)
 Raphael Saadiq - guitar and bass (track 1)
 Minnesota - producer
 Easy Mo Bee - producer
 Kanye West - producer
 Shuggie Otis - guitar
 L Mitchellon (?) - piano, organ
 Warryn Campbell - producer
 Psycho Les - producer
 88-Keys - producer

References

External links 
 The New Danger at Discogs
 Review and audio interview at Vibe

2004 albums
Mos Def albums
Albums produced by Easy Mo Bee
Albums produced by Kanye West
Albums produced by Raphael Saadiq
Albums produced by Warryn Campbell
Albums produced by 88-Keys
Cultural depictions of Jack Johnson